Arenas River may refer to:

Arenas River (Las Marias, Puerto Rico)
Arenas River (Yabucoa, Puerto Rico)